The Pericymini are a tribe of moths in the family Erebidae.

Genera
Pericyma
Zethes

References

 
Erebinae
Moth tribes